Tennessee elected its members August 3–4, 1807, after the Congress began but before the first session met.

See also 
 United States House of Representatives elections, 1806 and 1807
 List of United States representatives from Tennessee

1807
Tennessee
United States House of Representatives